Juan Barahona (born 15 February 1978) is an Ecuadorian judoka. He competed in the men's extra-lightweight event at the 2000 Summer Olympics.

References

1978 births
Living people
Ecuadorian male judoka
Olympic judoka of Ecuador
Judoka at the 2000 Summer Olympics
Place of birth missing (living people)
South American Games bronze medalists for Ecuador
South American Games medalists in judo
Competitors at the 2002 South American Games
21st-century Ecuadorian people